The Sennybridge Training Area (SENTA) is a UK Ministry of Defence military training area near the village of Sennybridge in Powys, Wales.  It consists of approximately 31,000 acres (12,000 ha) of Ministry of Defence freehold land and 6,000 acres (2,500 ha) of land leased from Forest Enterprise.

The training area is the third largest military training area in the United Kingdom. It covers 12 miles (19 km) south west to north east and 5 miles (8 km) south east to north west. It lies to the north of the Brecon Beacons National Park on Mynydd Eppynt. The site was acquired by the War Office in 1939.

Units
 Soldier Development Wing - part of ATC Pirbright.
 Queen's Division Courses - Divisional Training Team Delivering Distributed Training for the Queen's Division.

References

Training establishments of the British Army
Geography of Powys
Military installations in Wales
Epynt
Military training areas in the United Kingdom